Kenneth C. Brill is a retired US diplomat.  He served as ambassador to the IAEA and the U.N. Office in Vienna; ambassador to Cyprus (1996-1999); acting ambassador and deputy chief of mission at the Embassy in New Delhi, India; and political counselor at the U.S. Embassy in Amman.  He is on the Board of Directors of The Stimson Center.

Biography
Brill graduated from Ohio University and received his MBA from the University of California, Berkeley.

Career
Brill retired from the Foreign Service after 35 years and became president of The Fund for Peace from 2010 to 2011.  His final position at the State Department was founding director of the National Counterproliferation Center (NCPC) (part of the Office of the Director of National Intelligence).

References

United States Foreign Service personnel
Ambassadors of the United States to India
Ambassadors of the United States to Cyprus
Ohio University alumni
Haas School of Business alumni
The Stimson Center
Year of birth missing (living people)
Living people